

Group A















Group B















References

External links
 FIBA Archive

EuroBasket Women 1995
EuroBasket Women squads